The Land Information Assurance Group  (LIAG) is a specialist Army Reserve unit

'On Information Warfare... Our potential adversaries may choose to adopt alternative weapons and unconventional (or asymmetric) strategies, perhaps attacking us through vulnerabilities in our open civil societies.'
Extract from The Strategic Defence Review, 1998

LIAG is a Royal Signals sponsored unit under Operational Command of the Joint Force Cyber Group of the UK Joint Forces Command, having transferred from 11 Signal Brigade in Apr 2015.

LIAG is a nationally recruited specialist unit.  In this, it is unlike most Army Reserve units which recruit volunteers from a multitude of  professional and personal backgrounds usually from a limited geographical area.  LIAG, like the medical; legal and veterinary units consists entirely of specialists, in LIAG's case selected for their professional and technical Cyber skills.  As such, they are spread around the UK, and the only training provided is on military skills.

Although LIAG is sponsored by the Royal Signals, unusually it is a multi-cap-badged unit and has had personnel from several other Army Regiments and Corps, including the Royal Artillery; REME; RAMC; RLC; Intelligence Corps and several infantry regiments.  It also has several officers who have previously served in the Royal Navy and the Royal Air Force although they have to transfer to the Royal Signals in order to be accepted into the unit.

Historically, it consisted entirely of commissioned Officers with the Officer Commanding and Command Group all being Lieutenant Colonels.  The remainder of the unit is comprised in the main of Majors and Captains although there are now positions being recruited for specialist Other Ranks.

According to the Royal Signals Institute, it has shifted under the operational command of Joint Forces Command by April 2015.

See also

 Units of the Royal Corps of Signals

References

External links
Land Information Assurance Group- on British Army official website

Military communications
Units and formations of the Royal Corps of Signals
Army Reserve (United Kingdom)